Friedland may refer to:

Places

Czech Republic
 Frýdlant v Čechách (Friedland im Isergebirge)
 Frýdlant nad Ostravicí (Friedland an der Ostrawitza)
 Frýdlant nad Moravicí (Friedland an der Mohra)

France 
 , street in Paris

Germany
 Friedland, Mecklenburg-Vorpommern
 Friedland, Brandenburg
 Friedland, Lower Saxony, a municipality in Göttingen
 Friedland (Amt)

Poland
 Korfantów (Friedland in Oberschlesien)
 Mieroszów (Friedland in Niederschlesien)
 Debrzno (Preußisch Friedland)
 Mirosławiec (Märkisch Friedland)

Russia
 Pravdinsk (Friedland in Ostpreußen), called Friedland 1917–1945

Other 
 Friedland (surname)
 Duchy of Friedland, duchy of Albrecht von Wallenstein 1627–1634
 Battle of Friedland, during the Napoleonic Wars in 1807
 French ship Friedland for ships named after the battle

See also 
Friedländer